Adam Nathan is a technical author/speaker, and currently works as a software architect at Google.  Adam was the core architect of Microsoft Popfly.  He has been involved with .NET technologies from the beginning, and has written a 1,600-page book on .NET/COM Interoperability.  He also created the PINVOKE.NET wiki, which helps .NET developers use unmanaged APIs.

Books 
 Windows 8 Apps with XAML and C# Unleashed
 101 Windows Phone 7 Apps: Volume 1: Developing Apps 1-50
 101 Windows Phone 7 Apps: Volume 2: Developing Apps 51-101
 WPF 4 Unleashed
 WPF 4.5 Unleashed
 Silverlight 1.0 Unleashed
 WPF Unleashed
 .NET and COM: The Complete Interoperability Guide
 ASP.NET: Tips, Tutorials, and Code
 XAML Unleashed

Interviews 
 Safari Books Online - Author Interview with Adam Nathan
 Interview from Canadian Information Processing Society (CIPS)
 Adam Nathan - Light up an app with WPF (on Channel 9)
 Adam Nathan and John Montgomery: Popfly - Now Open to the General Public and New Features Announced (on Channel 9)
 Adam Nathan: and Suzanne Hansen: First Look at Popfly Game Creator Alpha (on Channel 9)

References

External links
 Adam Nathan's new weblog
 Adam Nathan's old weblog

Microsoft employees
Year of birth missing (living people)
Living people
Place of birth missing (living people)